Alois Hrašek was a Czech swimmer. He competed for Czechoslovakia in two events at the 1920 Summer Olympics.

References

External links
 
 

Year of birth missing
Year of death missing
Czech male swimmers
Olympic swimmers of Czechoslovakia
Swimmers at the 1920 Summer Olympics
Place of birth missing